Walter Ernest Smith (25 March 1884 – 1972) was an English football goalkeeper who played for Leicester Fosse and Manchester City before World War I, and played for Port Vale, Plymouth Argyle, and Grimsby Town after the war. He helped Manchester City to win the Second Division title in 1909–10.

Career
Smith played for Leicester Imperial and Leicester Fosse, before joining Manchester City for £600 in June 1906. He made 22 First Division and two FA Cup appearances in 1906–07. He was then an ever-present in the 44 game 1907–08 campaign, as the "Citizens" finished third in the league, some nine points behind rivals Manchester United. He featured 39 times in the 1908–09 relegation season. He only played three games however, in the 1909–10 campaign, as City won promotion as champions of the Second Division. He then won back his first team place at Hyde Road, playing 33 matches in the 1910–11 season. He featured just 12 times in 1911–12, as he shared goalkeeping duties with Augustus Beeby and Jim Goodchild. He featured just 13 times in the 1912–13 season, as Goodchild established himself as the club's preferred stopper. Smith regained his place in 1913–14, missing just two of City's 44 matches. He played 41 games in 1914–15, in the last season before World War I put a temporary halt to the Football League. He made 13 appearances in the 1915–16, 1916–17, and 1918–19 wartime leagues. He also guested for Fulham and Leicester Fosse during the war. At the end of hostilities, Goodchild became City's number one, and limited Smith to nine appearances in 1919–20.

He joined Second Division Port Vale in October 1920 for a 'modest' fee. However, the morning of his debut game on South Shields on 23 October he was arrested on assault charges against a chambermaid at the hotel where the team had spent the night. After being released on bail he played the game with a detective standing in the crowd, possibly distracting the team as they went on to lose 6–1. He was found not guilty at his trial in November 1920 and went on to have a successful career with the club. He featured 29 times in the 1920–21 season, ahead of back-up goalkeepers Alfred Bourne and Jonathan Hammond. He played 13 games in the 1921–22 campaign, before he seriously injured his leg in a 4–1 defeat by Coventry City at Highfield Road on 31 December. Teddy Peers was signed to take his place, and Smith failed to regain his first team place upon his recovery. He was released at the end of the season, but despite being 38 did not retire. Instead he moved on to Plymouth Argyle and later turned out for Grimsby Town.

Career statistics
Source:

Honours
Manchester City
Football League Second Division: 1909–10

References

1884 births
1972 deaths
Footballers from Leicester
English footballers
Association football goalkeepers
Leicester City F.C. players
Manchester City F.C. players
Fulham F.C. wartime guest players
Leicester City F.C. wartime guest players
Port Vale F.C. players
Plymouth Argyle F.C. players
Grimsby Town F.C. players
English Football League players
English Football League representative players